Glyphic is the second studio album by the electronic artist Boxcutter. It was released in 2007 on Planet Mu Records.

Track listing
 "Glyphic" – 7:50
 "Windfall" – 2:50
 "Bug Octet" – 5:23
 "Rusty Break" – 5:13
 "J Dub" – 4:35
 "Chiral" – 4:37
 "Kaleid" – 5:30
 "Bloscid" – 3:22
 "Foxy" – 5:02
 "Lunal" – 4:57
 "Nanobot" – 2:16
 "Fieldtrip" – 6:32

References

Planet Mu albums
Boxcutter (musician) albums
2007 albums